The Madom da Sgióf is a mountain of the Swiss Lepontine Alps, located between Maggia and Brione in the canton of Ticino.

References

External links
 Madom da Sgióf on Hikr

Mountains of the Alps
Mountains of Switzerland
Mountains of Ticino
Lepontine Alps